Roland Bell (16 May 1857 – 29 January 1935) was an English cricketer.  Bell was a right-handed batsman who bowled roundarm slow, though with which arm he bowled with is not known.  He was born at Bishop's Stortford, Hertfordshire.

Bell made a single first-class appearance for Surrey against Nottinghamshire at The Oval in 1876.  Bell was dismissed for a single run in Surrey's first-innings of 83 by Alfred Shaw, with Nottinghamshire replying to this innings by making 153 in their first-innings.  Surrey made 142 in their second-innings, with Bell being dismissed again by Shaw, this time for 3 runs.  Nottinghamshire chased down their target of 73 to win the match by 10 wickets.  This was his only major appearance for Surrey.

He later became the headmaster of Huntingdon Grammar School, a position he held from 1885 to 1905.  He died at Leamington Spa, Warwickshire on 29 January 1935.

References

External links
Roland Bell at ESPNcricinfo
Roland Bell at CricketArchive

1857 births
1935 deaths
Cricketers from Bishop's Stortford
English cricketers
Surrey cricketers
Schoolteachers from Hertfordshire
Heads of schools in England